Sulkin is a surname. Notable people with the surname include:

 Alec Sulkin (born 1973), American animation writer and producer
 David Sulkin (born 1949), English theatre and opera director
 Gregg Sulkin (born 1992), British actor